C. Kenneth Dodd Jr.,  is an American herpetologist and conservationist.  He earned his Ph.D. under Edmund D. Brodie Jr. from Clemson University in 1974.  From 1976 to 1984 he worked in the research division of the U.S. Fish and Wildlife Service, then he transferred to the U.S. Geological Survey in 1984, where he remained until his retirement in 2007.   He is currently Courtesy Associate Professor in the Department of Wildlife Ecology and Conservation, University of Florida and an Affiliate of the Florida Museum of Natural History.  He has published over 200 papers, reviews and books.  Much of his research focuses on turtle and amphibian ecology/conservation.  He, along with R. Bruce Bury and Garry Fellers were the first to suggest widespread amphibian declines were progressing. He is a nationally recognized herpetologist.

In addition to his research contributions, in 2003 he provided critical testimony about buffer zones and the Flatwoods Salamander on behalf of the Sierra Club.

Author:
Reptile Ecology and Conservation: A Handbook of Techniques, May 5, 2016

Frogs of the United States and Canada, 2-vol. set, June 2013

Amphibian Ecology and Conservation: A Handbook of Techniques (Techniques in Ecology & Conservation), Sept. 17, 2009

North American Box Turtles: A Natural History (Animal Natural History Series) Aug 5, 2002
Hardcover and paperback

Honors and awards
1980, 1985, Special Achievement Award
1987, 1992, U.S. Fish and Wildlife Service
1985 Annual Award for Conservation. Desert Tortoise Council
1986 Quality Performance Award. U.S. Fish and Wildlife Service
1990 Co-Chairman's Special Award. Gopher Tortoise Council
1998 U.S. Department of Interior STAR Award
2003 U.S. Department of Interior STAR Award
2004 U.S. Department of Interior STAR Award
2009 Annual Award for Conservation. Desert Tortoise Council

Board memberships
Vice-president, The Herpetologists’ League (2000-2001)
President, The Herpetologists’ League (2002-2003)
Past-President (Member of Board of Trustees), The Herpetologists’ League (2004-2009)
Editorial board, Herpetologica (2004–Present)
Best Student Paper Committee, HL (1988)
Resolutions Committee, HL (1990-1994; Chair, 1993-4)
Board of Governors, ASIH (1990-1995)
Secretary-Treasurer, Southeast Div., ASIH (1990-1991)
Vice president, Southeast Div., ASIH (1991-1992)
President, Southeast Div., ASIH (1992-1993)
Editorial Policy Committee, ASIH (2005-2010)
Stoye Award Committee, ASIH (1991)
Committee on Environmental Quality, ASIH (1978-1991, 1993-1997)
Editorial board, Copeia (1997-2002)
Board of Councilors, ISSCA (1996-2005)
President, ISSCA (2003-2005)
Editorial board, Alytes
Board of directors, SSAR (1998-2000)
Editorial board, Journal of Herpetology (1993-1994)
Associate editor, Journal of Herpetology (1995-2003)
Committee on Grants in Herpetology, SSAR (1978-1979, 1986)
SSAR Conservation Committee (1979-1998; Chair 1994-1998)
Seibert Prize Award Committee, SSAR (1992)
Editorial board, Chelonian Conservation and Biology (1993-2011)
Editorial board, Herpetological Conservation and Biology (2006–Present)
Editorial Review Board, Amphibian & Reptile Conservation
Editorial board, Applied Herpetology (2002-2009)
Board of Governors, Annual Symposium on Sea Turtle Biology and Conservation (1993-1998)
Best Student Paper Committee, Annual Symposium on Sea Turtle Biology and Conservation (2000, Chair: 1993-1995)
Student Travel Award Committee, Annual Symposium on Sea Turtle Biology and Conservation (Chair: 1993-1997)
Nominating Committee, Annual Symposium on Sea Turtle Biology and Conservation (1994)
Scientific Committee, World Conference on Sea Turtle Conservation, 1979, Washington, D.C.
Technical Advisory Committee, Western Atlantic Turtle Symposium, 1983, San Jose, Costa Rica.
Consultant, Wider Caribbean Sea Turtle Recovery and Conservation Network (1984-1985).
Convenor, Roundtable on Conservation Problems, First World Congress of Herpetology, 1989, Kent, England.
Scientific Commission, International Congress of Chelonian Conservation, Gonfaron, France, 1995
Executive Council, World Congress of Herpetology (2005-2012)
Audit Committee, World Congress of Herpetology (2006–Present)
IUCN Freshwater Turtle and Tortoise Specialist Group (Full member)
IUCN Crocodile Specialist Group (Corresponding member, 1983-1989; Full member, 1989-1997)
IUCN Marine Turtle Specialist Group (Full member)
IUCN/SSC Declining Amphibians Populations Task Force (Chair, Southeastern U.S. section, 1992-2000)

Rattlesnake Complaint
In 1979, Dodd was fired from the U.S. Fish and Wildlife Service after he wrote a letter on official stationery to Dominique, a Washington D.C. French restaurant, asking the restaurant to stop offering a dish made from Pennsylvania timber rattler because the species was in danger of becoming extinct.  Dominique was a favorite restaurant of then-Interior Secretary Cecil D. Andrus.  The letter became public after being leaked to a gossip column in the Washington Star, and Dodd was fired on October 11, 1979.  But Dodd was reinstated to his job a week later, on October 18, after a coalition of 15 national wildlife groups wrote to Andrus, demanding Dodd's reinstatement, and after several members of Congress had advised Andrus to reinstate Dodd or face an inquiry by the House of Representatives.

References

External links
C. Kenneth Dodd Jr. University of Florida

Living people
People from Gainesville, Florida
Clemson University alumni
University of Kentucky alumni
Arizona State University alumni
American herpetologists
Conservation biologists
Year of birth missing (living people)